I Pledge Allegiance to the Grind II is the third studio album by American rapper Killer Mike. It was released on July 8, 2008, by Grind Time Official and SMC Recordings. The album features guest appearances from 8Ball & MJG, Chamillionaire and Ice Cube, among others. His collaborations with UGK, Trae and Yo Gotti were also announced, but did not appear on the final track list of the album. Starting January 13, 2010, Killer Mike has authorized this album to be downloaded for free by fans as an effort to promote his forthcoming album.

Track listing

References

2008 albums
Killer Mike albums
Albums produced by No I.D.
Albums produced by Tha Bizness
SMC Recordings albums
Sequel albums
Albums produced by Malay (record producer)